In December 1973, a Palestinian terrorist group executed a series of attacks originating at Rome-Fiumicino Airport in Italy which resulted in the deaths of 34 people. The attacks began with an airport-terminal invasion and hostage-taking, followed by the firebombing of a Pan Am aircraft and the hijacking of a Lufthansa flight.

Pan Am flight 110 was scheduled to depart from Rome, Italy and arrive in Tehran, Iran, by way of Beirut, Lebanon. On 17 December 1973, shortly before takeoff, the airport terminal and the flight aircraft were attacked and the aircraft was set on fire by armed Palestinian gunmen, resulting in the deaths of thirty persons on the plane and two in the terminal.

Following the flight 110 attack, the gunmen hijacked Lufthansa Flight 303 and killed two more people. They ended up in the custody of the Kuwaiti authorities.

Background 

Since the ousting of the Palestine Liberation Organization (PLO) from Jordan, following the Jordanian-Palestinian civil war, Palestinian military organizations made South Lebanon their headquarters and base of operations, enlisting militants from Palestinian refugee camps. South Lebanon was referred to as Fatah-land, due to the almost complete control of Fatah and other military Palestinian organizations over this -officially Lebanese- area, which they used to stage attacks against Israel, mainly targeting civilians, and to engage in armed operations abroad, termed "acts of terrorism."

Terminal invasion and firebombing of Pan Am Flight 110 

On 17 December 1973, Pan Am Flight 110 was scheduled to fly from Leonardo da Vinci International Airport in Rome to Beirut International Airport in Lebanon and then on to Tehran, Iran. At the controls of the Boeing 707-321B (registration  name Clipper Celestial) were Captain Andrew Erbeck, First Officer Robert Davison, and Flight engineer Kenneth Pfrang.

At approximately 12:51 local time in Rome, just as Flight 110 was preparing to taxi, five Palestinian people made their way through the terminal building, armed with automatic firearms and grenades. The terrorists removed submachine guns from hand-luggage bags and began firing throughout the terminal, shattering windows and killing two people. Pilots and crew in the cockpit of the aircraft were able to observe travelers and airport employees in the building running for cover. Captain Erbeck announced over the plane's public address system that there was "some commotion" in the terminal and instructed all the people on board to get down on the floor.

Several of the gunmen ran across the tarmac toward the Pan American jet, throwing one phosphorus incendiary and other hand grenades through the open front and rear doors of the aircraft. The explosions knocked crew and passengers to the ground, and the cabin filled with thick, acrid smoke from the resulting fires. Stewardesses were able to open the emergency exit over the wing on one side of the plane; the other exit was obstructed by gunmen. The crew attempted to evacuate as many passengers as possible through the available exit, but twenty-nine passengers and purser Diana Perez died on the plane, including all eleven passengers in first class. Four Moroccan officials heading to Iran for a visit, and Bonnie Erbeck, wife of the plane's captain, were among the dead. Captain Erbeck survived the attack. Also killed were fourteen Aramco employees and employee family members. The aircraft itself was destroyed.

Lufthansa hijacking 

Having assaulted the Pan Am aircraft, the five gunmen took hostage several Italians and Lufthansa ground crew members into Lufthansa Flight 303 Boeing 737 (registration  waiting to depart for Munich. An Italian border police officer, 20-year-old Antonio Zara, was shot dead on the ground when he first arrived at the scene of the attack, after the general alarm had been sounded by the airport's control tower.

The hijackers then forced the crew already on board to move the plane towards the runway in order to take off. For the first part of the plane's taxiing, the aircraft was chased by several Carabinieri and Guardia di Finanza vehicles, who abandoned the chase after the hijackers threatened to kill all the hostages on board. At 13:32 hours, just over half an hour from the start of the action, the plane took off for Athens, Greece, where it arrived at 16:50 hours, local Athens time.

The attack turned out to be so lightning-fast that it did not allow an adequate response from the airport's police forces. In fact, only 117 officers were on duty at the airport during that period: 9 carabinieri, 46 customs officers and 62 State Police officers, of which only 8 were employed in the anti-sabotage service; a negligible number for an intercontinental airport like Fiumicino. Everything was aggravated by the fact that the airport structure was absolutely not suitable for the prevention of terrorist attacks, as it was conceived at a time when such events were not foreseeable.

Athens stopover
Upon landing in Athens, the terrorists demanded by radio the release of two Palestinian gunmen responsible for an attack on Hellinikon International Airport. They claimed to have killed five hostages, including the plane's first officer. The terrorists then threatened to crash the jet in the middle of Athens if their demands were not met. In reality, only one Italian hostage, Domenico Ippoliti, had been killed and one other hostage wounded. After failing to persuade the Greek authorities on releasing the terrorists, they limited their demands to just refuel and leave. The plane took off again from Athens after sixteen hours on the ground and after the gunmen had released the wounded hostage and dumped the body of the dead hostage onto the tarmac.

Damascus stopover
The plane next headed for Beirut, Lebanon, where Lebanese authorities refused to allow its landing, and blocked the runway with vehicles. Cyprus also refused to allow landing. The terrorists on board ordered the plane to head for Damascus, Syria, allegedly because the plane was running low on fuel. After they landed in the Syrian capital's airport, Air Force Commander Major General Naji Jamil attempted to persuade the Palestinians to release the hostages, but they refused. The Syrians provided food to everyone on board and refueled the plane. They also treated one of the hijackers for a head injury. The plane took off again two to three hours after landing.

Landing in Kuwait
The commandeered jet headed for Kuwait, where Kuwaiti authorities refused to allow it to land. Captain Kroese was ordered by the terrorists to land anyway on a secondary runway. An hour of negotiations between the Palestinian gunmen and the Kuwaiti authorities ended with the release of all twelve remaining hostages in exchange for "free passage" to an unknown destination for the hijackers. The terrorists were permitted to retain their weapons and, upon leaving the plane, raised their hands to the cameras in a V-for-victory sign.

Aftermath 
The terrorists negotiated their escape, but they were still captured shortly thereafter. The Kuwaiti authorities, after questioning the terrorists, decided not to put them on trial and considered the possibility of handing them over to the (PLO).
The factors that came into play at this point were complex, and sparked a diplomatic case that saw the US and many Arab and European countries clashing over the fate of the terrorists and which nation should have trialled them.

Italy, despite having made a formal request for extradition to the Arab emirate, did not appear really intentioned to trial and detain the terrorists on its own territory. It was indeed a mere formal act, and - when the Italian government was replied that, since there was no treaty that regulated extradition with Kuwait, it resulted impossible - no further pressure was applied. The most probable reason which dissuaded Italy from the desire to take over the command, was the danger that any detention in Italian prisons would have been a reason for retaliation by other Palestinian terrorists, who could have given rise to a new attack on Italian territory, eager to request the release of their companions. Subsequently, in fact, the last Palestinian terrorists detained in Italy, responsible for the failed attack in Ostia in 1972, were also released, probably for the same reason. Other European countries such as the Netherlands also followed this line. 
Those events were the genuine proof that the Italian government had decided to treat the tragic event of Fiumicino with the yardstick of "national interest", accepting compromises that were sometimes even humiliating.

After gruelling international events, in 1974 the Egyptian president Anwar Sadat agreed to their be taken to Cairo under the responsibility of the PLO and processed by the same for conducting an "unauthorized operation". They remained in prison until November 24, 1974, when following negotiations began during the hijacking of a British plane in Tunisia, carried out precisely to request their release, the five men of the commando were released in Tunisia with the complicity of many Arab, European governments and the US. From that moment there were no more certain news about their fate and they disappeared, probably hosted by some Arab country, remaining unpunished.

See also 

List of accidents and incidents involving commercial aircraft
List of aircraft hijackings
List of terrorist incidents
Terrorism in Europe

References

Sources 
Death in Rome Aboard Flight 110, TIME, 31 December 1973. Retrieved on 10 April 2007. 
"Arab Hijackers Land in Kuwait; Hostages Freed". The New York Times, 19 December 1973. Page 1. 
"Arab Guerrillas Kill 31 in Rome During Attack on U.S. Airliner, Take Hostages and Go to Athens". The New York Times, 18 December 1973. Page 1. 
Athens attack leaves 3 dead, BBC News, 5 August 1973. Retrieved on 10 April 2007.
Gabriele Paradisi, Rosario Priore: La strage dimenticata Fiumicino 17 December 1973, Reggio Emilia 2015.

1973 crimes in Greece
1973 crimes in Italy
December 1973 events in the United States
1973 murders in Italy
1973 crimes in Kuwait
1970s in Lazio
Accidents and incidents involving the Boeing 707
Accidents and incidents involving the Boeing 737 Original
Aircraft hijackings in Europe
Arson attacks on vehicles
Arson in Italy
Aviation accidents and incidents in 1973
Aviation accidents and incidents in Italy
December 1973 crimes
December 1973 events in Europe
Explosions in 1973
Fiumicino
1973
Mass murder in 1973
Massacres in Italy
Murder in Rome
Palestinian terrorist incidents in Europe
1973|Pan Am Flight 0110
Terrorist attacks attributed to Palestinian militant groups
Terrorist attacks on airports
Terrorist incidents in Europe in 1973
Terrorist incidents in Greece in the 1970s
Palestinian terrorist incidents in Greece
Terrorist incidents in Italy in 1973
Terrorist incidents in Kuwait
Terrorist incidents in Lazio
Terrorist incidents in Syria in 1973
Greece–State of Palestine relations